Lamarmora is a station of the Brescia Metro, in the city of Brescia in northern Italy. The station is located on Via Lamarmora.

This large station is designed to be an interchange with a planned 3.5 km line, running westerly from Lamarmora Station to the Fiera Exhibition Ground, through a densely populated part of the city.

Connecting buses
 2 – Pendolina – Urago Mella – Volturno – Centro – BS2 – Fiera Chiesanuova
 13 – Gussago – Cellatica – Torricella – Cantore – Ugoni – Stazione – Corsica – Lamarmora – Poliambulanza

References

External links

Brescia Metro stations
Railway stations opened in 2013
2013 establishments in Italy
Railway stations in Italy opened in the 21st century